Guisan may refer to:
 1960 Guisan, a main-belt asteroid named after Henri Guisan
 Antoine Guisan, Swiss ecologist
 Esperanza Guisán (1940–2015), Spanish philosopher
 General-Guisan-Quai, a section of the Zürich quays named after Henri Guisan
 Hélène Guisan (born 1916), Swiss author
 Henri Guisan (1874–1960), Swiss politician and general
 Jean Samuel Guisan (1740–1801), Swiss engineer
 María del Carmen Guisán, Spanish economist